Underworld: Red in Tooth and Claw is an IDW Publishing 3-part comic book series featuring Kevin Grevioux's character, Lycan-enforcer, Raze, in the Underworld franchise.

Overview
Underworld: Red in Tooth and Claw was written as a non-canon account of how Raze, Lucian's Right-hand man, became a Lycan, flashing before his eyes, right before he is killed by Viktor.

Volume #1
Begins with Raze facing-off against Kraven's enforcer, Soren, after having found Lucian seemingly dead, Raze transforms and takes the opportunity to kill Soren. Raze then tries to kill Viktor, but Viktor grabs him by the throat. Raze's life flashes before his eyes, as he thinks back to 1373 AD, when he was still human.

His name back then was "Koro", and he was a mighty East African warrior, with strength to kill an adult male Lion with his bare hands. He believes the Lion to be the real culprit behind the 'Devil' that the 'Mganga' of Koro's village had been telling the villagers that he-alone could protect them from. Despite what Koro tells his fellow villagers, they persist in believing that the con man who poses as Mganga is real.

Meanwhile, out in the veldt, as the sun sets, a group of Lycans are making camp within a rock formation. They argue whether or not the 'City of Sanctuary', that Lucial told them of is really worth looking for, as they are all hungry. Lucian appears, telling them show some discipline, and that 'Axum' "is no fools quest", and that there, they will be able to regroup and build a new army to fight back against the Vampires. He also warns them to be careful, as there are Death Dealers in the area.

That night, the team of Death Dealers-in question have already sighted some of the Lycans, having followed the trail of slaughtered livestock. The Leader of the team, Vayer, an experienced Lycan Hunter, wants to wait until the Lycans are vulnerable before they strike, while a more fool-hardy Death Dealer wants to strike then and there.

Three warriors from Koro's village are on guard over their slaughtered livestock when they hear the howls of creatures they not familiar with. When they investigate, they discover that their livestock have been slaughtered. They rally to hunt and kill whoever was responsible and bring glory to their tribe. However, only two return to their village later, one near death.

The charlatan-Mganga starts to stir-up the villagers fears, pro-claiming how that he-alone can protect them from the 'Evil-that-comes-by-Night', the Black-Hearted Devil. Koro alone does not buy into the false Mganga's words, and argues that it may more likely just be another Mnyama, and that they should put together a hunting party. When no-one will go with him, Koro declares that he will go alone.

On his hunt, Koro finds the remains of a Lion, and, not recognizing the tracks of beast that attacked, fears that the Mganga may have spoken true after all. Following the tracks, Koro comes across the pack of Lycan, who have brought down an Elephant. At the same time, the Death Dealers, who are also tracking the Lycans, lie in wait for the Lycans to become vulnerable before they strike. Knowing none of this, Koro charges at the Lycans, only to be confronted by Lucian, but keeps charging.

Vayer, the leader of the team of Death Dealers, instructs his team to wait for his signal. Koro kills one of the Lycans, (still in Human form,) with his bare-hands, which impresses Vayer and Lucian. One of the other Vampires, Lazar, impatient, fires his crossbow. With the element of surprise lost by Lazar, Vayer is left with no choice but to order his team to open fire.

A number of the Lycans flee, and the Death Dealers take the injured one captive. One of the Death Dealers want to kill a restrained Koro, as he has seen too much, but Vayer wants instead to Turn Koro, as he has never seen a human with such physical strength, and gain a True Warrior for their cause, as opposed to Lazar, who could not control himself.

They interrogate the Lycans, who refuse to talk. Lazar kicks Koro and arrogantly and openly comments how it's too bad he can't drain him dry. Vayer reprimands Lazar for his actions, as they report to Marcus, who does not favor those who would take the Elders' Bans on feeding off of Humans 'lightly'. Meanwhile, Lucian and the other Lycans are spying on the Death Dealers and observe what Koro does as he frees himself and drives away the Vampires for the moment, and frees the wounded Lycan.

Lucian calls the other Lycans to attack while the Death Dealers while they are distracted. They all Change and attack. As Koro escapes he is confronted by Lucian, and is startled by Lucian's speed. Lucian tells Koro; "Fear not, Warrior... I have plans for you!" Lucian then bites Koro.

Volume #2

Volume #3

Credits
Story by Kris Oprisko and Danny McBride

Art by Nick Postic and Nick Marinkovich

Lettering by Robbie Robbins

Design by Cindy Chapman

Edited by Jeff Mariotte

Collection Edited by Alex Garner

Red in Tooth and Claw